Mary Carolyn Beaudry (November 25, 1950 – October 20, 2020) was an American archaeologist, educator and author whose research focused on historical archaeology,   material culture and the anthropology of food. She was a Professor of Archaeology, Anthropology, and Gastronomy at Boston University (BU).

Beaudry participated in archaeological fieldwork in New England, Virginia, the Western Isles of Scotland and the Caribbean. 
She was visiting professor at the University of Sheffield and Bristol University. Towards the end of her life, Beaudry focused her research interests on the anthropology of food.

In 2013, Beaudry was the recipient of the J. C. Harrington Award and Medal in Historical Archaeology, for "life-time contributions and dedication to the discipline of Historical Archaeology".

Beaudry died of complications of an existing heart condition on October 20, 2020.

Education 
Beaudry attended the College of William and Mary, initially choosing a major in English, with the goal of being a writer. In 1970, she enrolled in an Introduction to Anthropology class in order to meet a college requirement. Along with her class, Beaudry was invited by the instructor to join the excavation of a prehistoric shell midden at Maycock Plantation.

During the excavation, Beaudry assisted in the discovery of the remains of a 17th-century child. The boy was unearthed wearing a copper and glass bead necklace. That discovery was a turning point for Beaudry. After learning that archaeologists can research the historical period and not just prehistory, Beaudry decided to pursue a career in historical archaeology and changed her major to Anthropology. Beaudry earned a BA in anthropology in 1973 and then went on to study at Brown University, obtaining a MA from the Department of Anthropology in 1975 and a PhD in 1980.

Career 

In 1980, Beaudry accepted a position as Assistant Professor of Anthropology at Boston University (BU). One of her first projects as Assistant Professor was to help create a new program in archaeology at BU. She was promoted to Professor of Archaeology & Anthropology at BU in 2004. In 2010, Beaudry took on the additional role of Professor of Gastronomy at Boston University Metropolitan College.

Beaudry has collaborated on a number of archaeological projects in New England, Virginia, Scotland and the Caribbean. Beginning in 1985, Beaudry joined a multi-year excavation at Boott Mills, a large-scale complex of early 18th century cotton mills located in Lowell, Massachusetts. Between 1986 and 1994, Beaudry worked on an excavation at Spencer-Pierce-Little Farm. Her research on the site focused on the land use, site structures, changing agricultural methods, and the families  that lived on the farm from 1635 to the present.

Beginning in 1995, Beaudry worked as a visiting professor and conducted field work and research in England and Scotland. She was a Visiting Professor, Department of Archaeology and Prehistory at the University of Sheffield. From 1995 to 2000, Beaudry worked with James Symonds on the Flora MacDonald project on the Island of Uist in Scotland. The project  was a multi-year study with the goal of investigating medieval and post-medieval settlements.

"Through archaeological survey, excavation, and the study of historical documents and oral tradition, the project aimed to examine the responses of the 18th- and 19th-century Hebridean population to the social and economic changes wrought by agricultural 'Improvement' and the infamous 'Highland Clearances'". Fieldwork was carried out over six seasons from 1995 to 2000.

In 2003, Beaudry was Visiting Professor, Department of Archaeology, at the University of Bristol. She recently joined an archaeological project on the Island of Montserrat.

Selected publications

Books

Journals

Awards 

2013 J. C. Harrington Award in Historical Archaeology

References 

American women archaeologists
College of William & Mary alumni
Brown University alumni
1950 births
2020 deaths